Echthistatodes is a genus of longhorn beetles of the subfamily Lamiinae, containing the following species:

 Echthistatodes brunneus Gressitt, 1938
 Echthistatodes subobscurus Holzschuh, 1993

References

Morimopsini